Pavlice may refer to:

 Pavlice, Trnava District, village and municipality of Trnava District, Slovakia
 Pavlice (Znojmo District), village and municipality in Znojmo District, Czech Republic.